Alexander Bergström (born January 18, 1986) is a Swedish professional ice hockey forward. He is currently playing with Karlskrona HK of the Hockeyettan (Div.1).

Playing career
Bergström after playing exclusively in the HockeyAllsvenskan belatedly made his Swedish Hockey League debut playing with Karlskrona HK during the 2015–16 SHL season.

After two seasons in the SHL, Bergström spent his first season abroad in Russia with HC Sibir Novosibirsk of the KHL in the 2017–18 season. Bergström left the club as a free agent, however opted to continue in the KHL, agreeing to one-year contract with Traktor Chelyabinsk on May 10, 2018.

Career statistics

Regular season and playoffs

International

References

External links

1986 births
Borås HC players
HC Sibir Novosibirsk players
HV71 players
Ice hockey players at the 2018 Winter Olympics
IK Oskarshamn players
Karlskrona HK players
Krefeld Pinguine players
Living people
Malmö Redhawks players
Olympic ice hockey players of Sweden
People from Osby Municipality
Rögle BK players
Swedish ice hockey forwards
Traktor Chelyabinsk players
Sportspeople from Skåne County